Grand County High School is the only high school in Grand County School District in Moab, Utah, USA. It enrolls over 400 students in grades 9-12 from Moab,  Castle Valley, and Thompson Springs in Grand County and Spanish Valley in San Juan County. The average graduating class is around 100 students.

All year

Cheerleading
Drill Team
School band
Choir
Drama
Debating

Fall sports

American football
Boys' and girls' cross country running
Boys' golf
Girls' soccer
Girls' tennis
Girls' volleyball

Winter sports

Wrestling
Boys' and girls' basketball
Boys' and girls' swimming

Spring sports

Boys' baseball
Boys' soccer
Girls' softball
Boys' tennis
Boys' and girls' track and field
Girls' golf

Student clubs

Amigos Club
Art Club
Debate and Speech Society
Drama Club
FCCLA
FFA
Indoor Soccer
National Honor Society
Recycling Club
Student Government
Student newspaper

References

External links

"Grand County High’s 2010 Sterling Scholars shine"

Public high schools in Utah
Schools in Grand County, Utah
Schools in San Juan County, Utah
Educational institutions established in 1919
Buildings and structures in Moab, Utah
1919 establishments in Utah